The British Moment is a term, first used by The Henry Jackson Society, to describe the alleged growth of British global influence in recent years.

The term comes from the treatise called The British Moment: The Case for Democratic Geopolitics in the Twenty-first Century, written by young academics in the Henry Jackson Society, a foreign policy organisation at the University of Cambridge. It suggests that the United Kingdom now finds itself in a unique period where it can play a major and decisive role in the 21st century world. As such, it calls for the British government to maintain strong armed forces and promote British values and interests robustly in the wider world. The authors also call for strong transatlantic relations between North America and Europe, and for further European integration, especially in issues pertaining to foreign affairs and military strategy.

The treatise came at a time when Britain's global role had increased under the leadership of Prime Minister Tony Blair, and British armed forces had been deployed in Afghanistan, Iraq, Sierra Leone, the former Yugoslavia and several other countries.

The book is published by the Social Affairs Unit in London.

References

See also
Euston Manifesto
History of the foreign relations of the United Kingdom
Foreign relations of the United Kingdom

Political manifestos
Political history of the United Kingdom